The 2007 Munster Senior Hurling Championship Final was a Hurling match played on 8 July 2007 at Semple Stadium, Thurles, County Tipperary. It was contested by Limerick and Waterford. Waterford claimed their third Munster Championship of the decade, beating Limerick on a scoreline of 3-17 to 1-14, a 9-point winning margin. Overall, this was Waterford's eighth Munster Senior Hurling Championship.

Match details

References

Munster
Munster Senior Hurling Championship Finals
Hurling in County Limerick
Waterford GAA matches